Coleophora serratulella is a moth of the family Coleophoridae. It is found from Germany to the Pyrenees and Alps and from France to Romania and Greece.

The larvae feed on Jurinea species and Serratula tinctoria. They create a composite leaf case of up to 16 mm long. The mouth angle is about 30°. Full-grown larvae can be found in July.

References

serratulella
Moths of Europe
Moths described in 1855